The 2000 United States Senate election in Arizona was held on November 7, 2000. Incumbent Republican U.S. Senator Jon Kyl won re-election to a second term. No candidate was nominated from the Democratic Party. Independent Bill Toel, Green party nominee Vance Hansen, and Libertarian party nominee Barry Hess each got more than 5% of the vote, a strong third party performance.

Candidates

Green
 Vance Hansen, retired teacher

Independent
 Bill Toel, professor and former banker

Libertarian
 Barry Hess, businessman

Republican
 Jon Kyl, incumbent U.S. Senator first elected in 1994

Campaign
Jon Kyl, a popular incumbent, did not draw a Democratic opponent despite being labeled as vulnerable at one point.

Results

See also 
  2000 United States Senate elections

References 

2000
Arizona
United States Senate election